Ziegleria is a genus of butterflies in the family Lycaenidae erected by Kurt Johnson in 1993. The species of this genus are found in the Neotropical realm.

Species
Ziegleria ceromia (Hewitson, 1877)
Ziegleria denarius (Butler & H. Druce, 1872)
Ziegleria guzanta (Schaus, 1902)
Ziegleria hernandezi (Johnson & Kroenlein, 1993)
Ziegleria hesperitis (Butler & H. Druce, 1872)
Ziegleria hoffmani Johnson, 1993
Ziegleria micandriana (Johnson, 1992)
Ziegleria perisus (H. H. Druce, 1907)
Ziegleria syllis (Godman & Salvin, [1887])

References

Duarte, M. & Robbins, R. K. (2010). "Description and phylogenetic analysis of the Calycopidina (Lepidoptera, Lycaenidae, Theclinae, Eumaeini): a subtribe of detritivores". Revista Brasileira de Entomologia. 54 (1): 45-64.

External links

Eumaeini
Lycaenidae of South America
Lycaenidae genera